Dalisandus or Dalisandos may refer to two Ancient cities and bishoprics in Asia Minor (Asian Turkey), now both Latin Catholic titular sees :

 Dalisandus in Isauria
 Dalisandus in Pamphylia